Drop Everything is a 1985 album by Polish rock band Lady Pank. The record was the first and the only album the band recorded in English and was aimed at international markets, being released in United States, UK, Mexico, Brazil and Argentina. Drop Everything was also released in Poland through a Polish record company called Klub Płytowy Razem.

All song featured on the album were originally released in 1983 on the band's debut album Lady Pank. Drop Everything features original instrumental tracks from Lady Panks debut effort with the original vocal tracks replaced by a rerecorded English version.

A music video for "Minus Zero" was made. The video was shot in Jersey City, New Jersey and is the first music video by a Polish artist to ever appear on MTV.

Track listing
All songs written by Jan Borysewicz, with original lyrics written by Andrzej Mogielnicki. English lyrics written/translated by Tom Wachtel
 "Minus Zero"
 "Hustler"
 "Hero"
 "The Zoo That Has No Keeper"
 "Be Good"
 "Do, Do"
 "Someone's Round the Corner"
 "Disturbance of the Order" (instrumental)
 "Stranger"
 "My Kilimanjaro"

Personnel
Jan Borysewicz - lead guitar, lead vocal on "Stranger"
Janusz Panasewicz — lead vocals
Edmund Stasiak — rhythm guitar, lead guitar on "Do, Do"
Paweł Mścisławski — bass
Jarosław Szlagowski — drums

References

1985 albums
MCA Records albums
Lady Pank albums